IGCM is an acronym for:

 Idiopathic giant cell myocarditis
 Incorporated Guild of Church Musicians
 Intermediate General Circulation Model
 Invasion Games Competence Model
 Ionospheric General Circulation Model
 International Gospel Christian Ministries